Human Performance is the fifth studio album by American indie rock band Parquet Courts, released on April 8, 2016 on Rough Trade Records.

The album was preceded by the singles "Dust", "Berlin Got Blurry", "Outside", and "Human Performance". It received a nomination for Best Recording Package at the 2017 Grammy Awards.

Background and recording
The band wrote much of Human Performance while recording the album at Dreamland Studios, New York: "We were living there, working around the clock, and there was never any time where we couldn’t be loud. It created an environment where we all encouraged each other to explore." Vocalist and guitarist Andrew Savage likened the experience to recording The Beatles' White Album: "I imagine it’s what recording [that album] would’ve been like except the whole band was getting along and nobody’s girlfriend was there."

Artwork
Receiving a nomination for Best Recording Package at the 2017 Grammy Awards, the album's artwork is by co-lead vocalist and guitarist A. Savage. Regarding its cover art, Savage noted: "I painted that in my own separate state of mind. I do a lot of artwork that has nothing to do with Parquet Courts, but it was around the same time that I started working on the Human Performance art, and it kind of just started screaming at me from the corner. It became apparent that it needed to be included, because so many of the same emotions were embedded within that painting were [also] within the lyrics of the record."

Accolades

Track listing

Personnel
Parquet Courts
Austin Brown - guitar, keys, vocals
A. Savage - guitar, car, vocals
Max Savage - drums, percussion, vocals
Sean Yeaton - bass, vocals

Additional musicians:
D. Crystal - flute on "Human Performance"
Jeff Tweedy - additional guitar on "Dust" and "Keep it Even"
Justin Pizzoferrato - additional car horn
Jeff Tweedy appears courtesy of dBpm Records and Anti-

Charts

References

2016 albums
Parquet Courts albums
Rough Trade Records albums